Pityococcidae is a family of scales and mealybugs in the order Hemiptera. There are at least three genera and about eight described species in Pityococcidae.

Genera
These three genera belong to the family Pityococcidae:
 Desmococcus McKenzie, 1942
 Pityococcus McKenzie, 1942
 † Cancerococcus Koteja, 1988

References

Further reading

 

Scale insects
Hemiptera families